Corinne Morgan (16 February 1876 – March 23, 1942) was the stage name of Corinne (or Cora) Welsh.  She was a contralto singer and pioneer recording artist who recorded popular songs in the early years of the twentieth century and was best known for her duets with Frank Stanley. Some sources misspell her name as Corrine.

She was born at Commercial Point, Ohio, the daughter of John C. Welsh, a farmer, and later moved to New York City.  In 1902, she started recording for the major cylinder recording companies of the day, including Edison and Columbia, although after 1904 most of her recordings were for Victor Records.  She was one of the first female singers to record regularly, and mainly recorded sentimental rather than comic songs.  Her successful duets with Frank Stanley included "It's a Lovely Day for a Walk" (1903), "Listen to the Mocking Bird" (1904), and "When You and I Were Young, Maggie" (1905).  She also recorded with the Haydn Quartet on "Toyland" (from the operetta Babes In Toyland, 1904), "Dearie" (1905) and "How'd You Like to Spoon with Me?" (1906).  Her solo recordings included "So Long, Mary" (1906), and "Lullaby" (1907).

She does not seem to have recorded after 1909, but worked as a professional singer until at least 1919.  In 1923, she married Charles Walter DuMont.  She died on March 23, 1942 at the age of 66,  though some sources give her year of death as 1945.

References

External links
 Corinne Morgan recordings at the Discography of American Historical Recordings.
  Credits at Allmusic.com

1876 births
1945 deaths
People from Pickaway County, Ohio
American contraltos
Pioneer recording artists
Victor Records artists